Carauari Airport  is the airport serving Carauari, Brazil.

Airlines and destinations

Accidents and incidents
On 15 December 1994, a TABA Embraer EMB 110 Bandeirante en route from Carauari and Tefé to Manaus was hijacked by two Colombian citizens. The passengers were released in the proximity of Tabatinga and the aircraft was flown to Colombia. The crew was released at the Brazilian Embassy in Bogotá.

Access

See also

List of airports in Brazil

References

External links

Airports in Amazonas (Brazilian state)